The 2007–08 Bangladeshi cricket season featured a Test series between Bangladesh and South Africa.

Honours
 National Cricket League – Khulna Division
 One-Day League – Rajshahi Division
 Most runs – Nazimuddin 720 @ 37.89 (HS 121*)
 Most wickets – Mosharraf Hossain 44 @ 24.52 (BB 6/13)

Test series

South Africa played two Test matches and three One Day Internationals, winning both Tests and all three ODIs.

See also
 History of cricket in Bangladesh

Further reading
 Wisden Cricketers' Almanack 2008

External sources
 Miscellaneous articles re Bangladesh cricket
 CricInfo re Bangladesh
 CricketArchive re tournaments in Bangladesh in 2007–08

2007 in Bangladeshi cricket
2008 in Bangladeshi cricket
Bangladeshi cricket seasons from 2000–01
Domestic cricket competitions in 2007–08